Longing for Dawn is a Canadian funeral doom metal band based in Montreal signed to Grau Records. The band has released three albums, the most recent of which is Between Elation and Despair, which was released in March 2009.

Band members

Current members 
Frederic Arbour – lead guitar, sound manipulation
Stefan Laroche – vocals
Simon Carignan – rhythm guitar
Etienne Lepage – bass guitar
Francois C. Fortin – drums

Former members 
Stian Weideborg – rhythm guitar
Sylvain Marquette – drums
Martin Gagnon – drums

Discography 

One Lonely Path (full-length, 2005, Twilight Foundation)
A Treacherous Ascension (full-length, 2007, Grau Records)
Between Elation and Despair (full-length, 2009, Grau Records)

References 

Canadian doom metal musical groups
Funeral doom musical groups
Musical groups established in 2002
Musical quintets
Musical groups from Montreal
2002 establishments in Quebec